In mathematics, the Newton polygon is a tool for understanding the behaviour of polynomials over local fields, or more generally, over ultrametric fields. 
In the original case, the local field of interest was essentially the field of formal Laurent series in the indeterminate X, i.e. the field of fractions of the formal power series ring ,
This is still of considerable utility with respect to Puiseux expansions. The Newton polygon is an effective device for understanding the leading terms 
of the power series expansion solutions to equations 
The exponents  here are certain rational numbers, depending on the branch chosen; and the solutions themselves are power series in 
The Newton polygon gives an effective, algorithmic approach to calculating .

After the introduction of the p-adic numbers, it was shown that the Newton polygon is just as useful in questions of ramification for local fields, and hence in algebraic number theory.  Newton polygons have also been useful in the study of elliptic curves.

Definition

A priori, given a polynomial over a field, the behaviour of the roots (assuming it has roots) will be unknown. Newton polygons provide one technique for the study of the behaviour of the roots.

Let  be a field endowed with a non-archimedean valuation , and let

Restated geometrically, plot all of these points Pi on the xy-plane. Let's assume that the points indices increase from left to right (P0 is the leftmost point, Pn is the rightmost point). Then, starting at P0, draw a ray straight down parallel with the y-axis, and rotate this ray counter-clockwise until it hits the point Pk1 (not necessarily P1). Break the ray here. Now draw a second ray from Pk1 straight down parallel with the y-axis, and rotate this ray counter-clockwise until it hits the point Pk2. Continue until the process reaches the point Pn;  the resulting polygon (containing the points P0, Pk1, Pk2, ..., Pkm, Pn) is the Newton polygon.

Another, perhaps more intuitive way to view this process is this : consider a rubber band surrounding all the points P0, ..., Pn. Stretch the band upwards, such that the band is stuck on its lower side by some of the points (the points act like nails, partially hammered into the xy plane). The vertices of the Newton polygon are exactly those points.

For a neat diagram of this see Ch6 §3 of "Local Fields" by JWS Cassels, LMS Student Texts 3, CUP 1986. It is on p99 of the 1986 paperback edition.

Main theorem 

Let  

be the corresponding lengths of the line segments projected onto the x-axis (i.e. if we have a line segment stretching between the points  and  then the length is ).

 The  are distinct;
 ;

Corollaries and applications 

Newton polygon theorem is often used to show the irreducibility of polynomials, as in the next corollary for example:
   
But this is impossible since  with  coprime .

Another simple corollary is the following:

 Assume that  is Henselian.

More generally, the following factorization theorem holds:

 Assume that  is Henselian.

Proof:
This shows that  divides 
Let .
This shows that ,  monic.   
Hence clearly , showing the main contention.
The condition for the irreducibility of  follows from the corollary above. (q.e.d.)  

The following is an immediate corollary of the factorization above, and constitutes a test for the reducibility of polynomials over Henselian fields:

 Assume that  is Henselian.
  
Other applications of the Newton polygon comes from the fact that a Newton Polygon is sometimes a special case of a Newton polytope, and can be used to construct asymptotic solutions of two-variable polynomial equations like

Symmetric function explanation
In the context of a valuation, we are given certain information in the form of the valuations of elementary symmetric functions of the roots of a polynomial, and require information on the valuations of the actual roots, in an algebraic closure. This has aspects both of ramification theory and singularity theory. The valid inferences possible are to the valuations of power sums, by means of Newton's identities.

History
Newton polygons are named after Isaac Newton, who first described them and some of their uses in correspondence from the year 1676 addressed to Henry Oldenburg.

See also

F-crystal
Eisenstein's criterion
Newton–Okounkov body
Newton polytope

References

 
 Gouvêa, Fernando: p-adic numbers: An introduction. Springer Verlag 1993. p. 199.

External links 

 Applet drawing a Newton Polygon

Algebraic number theory
Symmetric functions
Isaac Newton